The Roewe Clever or SAIC Clever (科莱威) is an all-electric car that is manufactured by the Chinese manufacturer SAIC Motor.

Overview

The Clever was launched in March 2020 as an electric city car aiming to replace the Roewe E50 with a 27kWh battery and a NEDC range of 260km. In November 2012, SAIC Motor introduced the production version of the Roewe E50, a four seater supermini sized hatchback for the market in China.

In 2020, the Clever electric car had single trim with pricing starting at  after available government incentives.

References

External links

Electric city cars
City cars
2020s cars
Clever
Cars introduced in 2020
Cars of China
Production electric cars